Bruffey Creek is a stream in the U.S. state of West Virginia.

Bruffey Creek has the name of Patrick Bruffey, an early settler.

See also
List of rivers of West Virginia

References

Rivers of Pocahontas County, West Virginia
Rivers of West Virginia